Acacia abbatiana is a species of Acacia native to eastern Australia.

See also
List of Acacia species

References

abbatiana
Fabales of Australia
Flora of Queensland
Taxa named by Leslie Pedley
Plants described in 1999